Live from London is a live album by American country singer-songwriter Bill Anderson. It was released in October 1975 via MCA Records and was produced by Peter Robinson. The record was Anderson's first live album and included over ten tracks. It was recorded in the United Kingdom and was released in the country as well. Anderson would record several more live projects during the course of his music career.

Background and release
Live from London was Anderson's first live record. It was recorded at the Hippodome Golden Green, located in London, England. It was recorded officially in front of a live audience in February 1975 and was produced by Peter Robinson. It was Anderson's first album to be produced by somebody other than Owen Bradley, his longtime producer at MCA Records. Also included on the album was Mary Lou Turner and his backing band, The Po' Boys 

A total of 14 tracks were included on the album. Included were some of his biggest hits, such as "Po' Folks," "I Love You Drops" and "I Get the Fever." Other tracks included were cover versions of songs by other artists, including "I Still Miss Someone" by Johnny Cash and "Poor Sweet Baby" by Jean Shepard. Dialogue is also included on the album, including a tribute track to the Grand Ole Opry.

The album was released in October 1975 via MCA Records. It was first issued as a vinyl LP, with tracks on each side of the record. Like some of his other compilations, the record did not reach any chart positions on Billboard upon its release. This included the Top Country Albums chart.

Track listing

Personnel
All credits are adapted from the liner notes of Live from London.

Musical personnel
 Bill Anderson – lead vocals
 Peter Robinson – producer

Release history

References

1975 live albums
Bill Anderson (singer) albums
MCA Records albums